Spitting Image is a British satirical television puppet show, based on the 1984 series of the same name created by Peter Fluck, Roger Law and Martin Lambie-Nairn. Similar to the original, the series features puppet caricatures of contemporary celebrities, such as Adele, James Corden, and Kanye West, as well as public figures, including former British Prime Minister Boris Johnson, several Conservative cabinet members such as Michael Gove, Dominic Raab and Priti Patel, and former US President Donald Trump.

ITV had plans for a reboot in 2006, but these were scrapped after a dispute over the Ant & Dec puppets used to host Best Ever Spitting Image, which were created against Law's wishes. In September 2019, Law announced the show would be returning with a new series. It was confirmed in March 2020 that the show would return on BritBox. Featuring 100 new puppets, the series debuted on 3 October that year. It was renewed for a second series four days later. The second series premiered on 11 September 2021. The show was cancelled by ITV on 24 October 2022.

Characters

Politicians 
Many British politicians were parodied in the show. Former British Prime Minister Boris Johnson was most prominent, portrayed as a bumbling idiot often manipulated by Chief Advisor Dominic Cummings.

Alongside Johnson was his Cabinet, which included:

 Dominic Raab, a martial arts fanatic and unable to name countries on a globe despite being Foreign Secretary. Depicted as incompetent and frequently on holiday; this references real life, when Raab was abroad on holiday in Crete during the Fall of Kabul.
 Priti Patel, portrayed as a vampire. Bullied the rest of the cabinet and idolised Margaret Thatcher.
 Dominic Cummings, an alien from the planet Epsilon 5 who was stranded in Durham. He is able to read and control people's minds and often manipulates Johnson to get his own way, once even attempting to devour his child. 
 Rishi Sunak, a billionaire who is depicted as the most popular of the cabinet ministers. He referred to himself as "Dishy Rishi" and was extremely vain and arrogant, expressing interest in becoming Prime Minister.
 Michael Gove, depicted as disloyal to the prime minister and addicted to drugs, shown attempting to overthrow Johnson and Cummings on multiple occasions. He was often seen dancing, which referenced a video where Gove was filmed in a nightclub.
 Matt Hancock, a wimp who hid whenever confronted with an uncomfortable situation.
 Sajid Javid, Secretary of State for Health and Social Care and described by Patel as "a massive egghead".
 Liz Truss, Foreign Secretary.
The Opposition (Labour Party) puppets included

 Keir Starmer, dull and uncharismatic, who took on the alter ego "Fox Man", a superhero who defended people with the Crime and Courts Act 2013.
 Jess Phillips, frustrated with Labour's unpopularity.

Nicola Sturgeon was depicted as an independence-obsessed Scottish nationalist. She appeared at the UEFA Champions League in Braveheart-style facepaint and assaulted the Boris Johnson puppet with a headbutt whilst shouting, "Glasgow kiss!" Her predecessor, Alex Salmond, was depicted as a Shrek lookalike.

Royal Family 
The main characters were:

 Elizabeth II: Portrayed as a maddened old lady who often used profane language and had a strong dislike of Canada. She was dismissive of her children, including Charles, and disapproved of Dominic Raab, describing him as "a complete waste of space."
 Charles III: As Prince of Wales he was portrayed as fed up with waiting to be king; so much so that when Elizabeth entered a coma he declared himself king.
 Camilla, Queen Consort: Charles's wife.
 William, Prince of Wales : Very charitable, politically correct and environmentally friendly; encouraged people to wash out their bean tins before putting them in the bin, spent money to protect the environment, not "wasting it on space rockets like Jeff Bezos or William Shatner", and convinced Elizabeth to write a letter to Leylah Fernandez, as "you're the queen of Canada too, grandmama."
 Catherine, Princess of Wales: Shown wearing elaborate and sometimes ridiculous outfits, such as a large hat fashioned from balloons (referencing Party Pieces) and a dress decorated with "feathers from a swan that was savaged by a corgi."
Other members who were parodied included the badly-educated Prince Harry, Duke of Sussex, his wife and former actress Meghan, Duchess of Sussex and Prince Andrew, Duke of York, who was hit with a wooden plank every time he appeared on screen.

International politicians 
US President Donald Trump was portrayed as a childish, gluttonous moron at odds with his constantly tired and exasperated vice president, Mike Pence. He was characterised as being unable to read, he tweeted from his bed with his sentient anus, and the colour of his complexion was credited to a coating of ketchup that covered his face. Trump was also depicted as being bald and his wig being a small animal that could crawl off his head and obey his commands. His wife, Melania Trump was shown as despising the role of First Lady and showed utter contempt and coldness towards her husband.

Joe Biden was portrayed as old, forgetful and unaware that he was president. He invoked the 25th Amendment to make Kamala Harris acting president whenever he went to the toilet, as "at my age that could take a while".

Vladimir Putin was portrayed as a tiny megalomaniac sitting on a throne. He poisoned people for entertainment and displayed a clear disregard for human life. In one sketch, he tried to make the COVID-19 puppet Prime Minister of Russia, stating that "every five years, we switch jobs. But I am always in charge." In Spitting Image, Russia was shown as a severely underdeveloped nation which was only beginning to grasp technology from the 1930s, including tape recorders and walkie-talkies being described by Putin as "all the best Russia has to offer".

Jacinda Ardern was overprotective of her country and implements a nationwide lockdown every time there was a single COVID-19 case reported in New Zealand.

Nancy Pelosi pandered to whatever minority group she met in a desperate bid to get votes as a result of being afflicted with "panderitis".

Jared Kushner was a lifeless mannequin paraded around by Ivanka Trump and sarcastically described by Donald Trump as "that dynamo of energy and excitement, Jared Kushner!"

Other international caricatures included Barack Obama, Ivanka Trump, Mitch McConnell, Angela Merkel, Emmanuel Macron, Narendra Modi, Scott Morrison, Xi Jinping and Katerina Sakellaropoulou.

Sport 
England manager Gareth Southgate was overly woke, Harry Kane spoke with a prominent lisp, Phil Foden was a womaniser and Marcus Rashford was ignored and shunned by the rest of his team. Liverpool manager Jürgen Klopp was exceedingly cheerful, optimistic and friendly, sometimes even to his disadvantage.

Golfer Tiger Woods was also portrayed as very calm, even under circumstances that would greatly irritate others.

Other sportspeople satirized on Spitting Image included fitness coach Joe Wicks, former professional footballer Micah Richards and professional tennis player Emma Raducanu.

Celebrities

Actors 
Many actors were also lampooned. Tom Cruise was a scientologist unable to tell the difference between his films and real life; Gwyneth Paltrow sold increasingly odd products; Brad Pitt was overly emotional; Idris Elba employed unusual interrogation tactics; Olivia Colman won everything that she entered; Daniel Craig was perplexed by Phoebe Waller-Bridge's lack of subtlety and Kevin Hart was tiny and in the pocket of Dwayne Johnson.

Musicians 
A Paul McCartney character was washed-up, phony and cheap, making substandard new songs in desperation to get another hit, and Adele was portrayed as a brash philanthropist with a very deep voice; Billie Eilish was relaxed with unintelligible speech and required subtitles to be understood;  Elton John was satirized wearing ruffles and huge, square glasses, whilst Ed Sheeran had a West Country accent and – in the trailer – had "carrots sprouting from (his) head" (an allusion to Sheeran's red hair) before this was changed at risk of offending viewers. Kanye West was an egotist who declares himself "Ruler of Earth" in reference to his 2020 presidential campaign.

Other musicians parodied on the show included Grimes, Beyoncé, Nicki Minaj and Taylor Swift.

Staff

Voices

Billy West as Joe Biden, Mitch McConnell, Mark Zuckerberg, Rudy Giuliani, and William Shatner
Debra Stephenson as Elizabeth II
Debra Wilson as Beyoncé, Michelle Obama, Kamala Harris, Oprah Winfrey, Nicki Minaj, Leondra Kruger, and additional voices
Guz Khan as Rishi Sunak and Narendra Modi (series 1)
Indira Varma as Priti Patel
Jess Robinson as Olivia Colman, Phoebe Waller-Bridge, Meghan Markle, Adele, Melania Trump, Ivanka Trump, Angela Merkel, Nancy Pelosi, Taylor Swift, Kim Kardashian, Jacinda Ardern, Greta Thunberg, Billie Eilish, Grimes, Nicola Sturgeon, Jess Philips, Chrissy Teigen, Gwyneth Paltrow, Ellen DeGeneres, Alexandria Ocasio-Cortez, Emma Raducanu, Ariana Grande, Alex Scott, Jameela Jamil, Carrie Johnson, Katerina Sakellaropoulou, Liz Truss, and additional voices
John DiMaggio as Mike Pence, Elon Musk, Tom Cruise, Mayor Cheeseburger, and additional voices
Lewis MacLeod as Prince Charles, Prince Andrew, Michael Gove, Richard Branson, Elton John, Ed Sheeran, David Attenborough, Matt Hancock, Brad Pitt, James Corden, Emmanuel Macron, Vladimir Putin, David Furnish, Scott Morrison, Pope Francis, Coronavirus, Daniel Craig, Tom Hardy, Gareth Southgate, Paul McCartney and Harry Kane (episode 15-present)
Lobo Chan as Xi Jinping
Matt Forde as Donald Trump, Boris Johnson, Keir Starmer, Alex Salmond, Phil Foden, Chris Whitty and the Frantic Sole
Phil LaMarr as Dwayne Johnson, LeBron James, Kevin Hart, Kanye West (series 1, series 2 in episode 16), RuPaul, Barack Obama, Jeff Bezos, Tiger Woods, The Flu, Lin-Manuel Miranda, Santa Claus, and additional voices
Luke Kempner as Piers Morgan, Jurgen Klopp, Harry Kane (episode 14), Joe Wicks, Bill Gates, Dominic Raab, and Gary Lineker
 Daniel Barker as Dominic Cummings, Prince William, and additional voices
Jason Forbes as Idris Elba, Marcus Rashford, Lewis Hamilton, and additional voices (series 1)
George Fouracres as Prince Harry (series 1)
Clare Corbett as Prince George, Princess Charlotte, Anneliese Dodds, John Healey, Nick Thomas-Symonds, and additional voices (series 1)
Eshaan Akbar as Rishi Sunak (series 2), Narendra Modi (series 2), and additional voices
Dane Baptiste as Marcus Rashford (series 2), Trevor McDonald, Kanye West (series 2), Prince Harry (series 2), and Micah Richards (series 2)
Tom Stourton
Steve Nallon as The Spirit of Margaret Thatcher
Esmonde Cole as Idris Elba (episode 16), Marcus Rashford (episode 16), Micah Richards (episode 16)
Jordan Maxwell

Puppeteers

Laura Bacon (series 2)
Warrick Brownlow-Pike
Dave Chapman
Sheila Clark
Philip Eason (series 1)
Iestyn Evans
Joe Greco
Andy Heath
Brian Herring
Matt Hutchinson
Mark Jefferis
Steven Kynman (series 1)
Rebecca Nagan
Wim Oppenheimer
Lynn Robertson Bruce (series 1)
Neil Sterenberg
Olly Taylor (series 1)
Chris Thatcher

Directors

Steve Bendelack (series 2)
Steve Connelly (series 1)
Andy De Emmony (series 1)
Adam Miller (series 2)
David Sant (series 2)

Writers

Gemma Arrowsmith (series 1)
David X. Cohen (series 1)
Sophie Duker (series 1)
Matt Forde
Rich Fulcher (series 2)
Jason Hazely
Sarah Isaacson (series 2)
Noah James (series 1)
Travis Jay (series 1)
George Jeffrie (deceased before premiere of show, writings released posthumously)
Laura Major
F. Maxwell (series 1)
Jordan Maxwell (series 1)
Karl Minns
Al Murray
Tom Neenan (series 1)
Pierre Novellie (series 1)
Bill Odenkirk
Brona C. Titley
Nico Tatarowicz
Bert Tyler-Moore
Patric M. Verrone
Phil Wang (series 1)
Jeff Westbrook
Keisha Zollar

Caricaturists

Jean-Marc Borot
Steve Brodner (series 1)
André Carrilho
Russ Cook
Thierry Coquelet
Frank Hoppman
Sebastian Krüger
Johannes Leak
David Stoten
Adrian Teal
Tim Watts
Wilfrid Woods
Mark Reeve

Production
In April 2017, it was reported that US broadcaster HBO was set to revive the series in light of the presidency of Donald Trump. However, no immediate official confirmation or announcement was made. In September 2019, the show was confirmed to be returning to screens twenty-three years after it originally ended, with the unveiling of the puppets of Trump, Vladimir Putin, Mark Zuckerberg, Prince Harry and Meghan Markle. Roger Law stated that the pilot for the new series had been filmed and that talks were in progress with US networks to take the show to a larger, global audience. According to Law, the revival is set to have a global appeal through a "uniquely British eye". Originally NBC was set to distribute the series stateside, however they backed out weeks before its initial broadcast. Executive producer Jon Thoday cited their "nervousness" with the series' content as the reason for their departure.

The writers for the revival include Jeff Westbrook, Al Murray, The Windsors creators Bert Tyler-Moore and George Jeffrie, Bill Odenkirk, David X. Cohen, Jason Hazeley, Keisha Zollar, Patric Verrone, Phil Wang, and Sophie Duker.

On 4 March 2020, the show was announced to be returning on the streaming service BritBox, as its first official commission. The show premiered on the service on 3 October 2020, featuring the voice talents of Billy West, Debra Stephenson, Debra Wilson, Guz Khan, Indira Varma, Jess Robinson, John DiMaggio, Lewis MacLeod, Lobo Chan, Matt Forde, and Phil LaMarr.

In an interview from July 2021, Law said that the second series would go massively over-budget like Boris Johnson's policies with full support from BritBox. He also said that the series would not be adding many new political figures, instead adding several footballers.

Episodes

Season 1 (2020)

Season 2 (2021)

Reception
The series received mixed reviews from critics. The decision to satirise Greta Thunberg garnered criticism as she was a minor at the time.

Mark Lawson of The Guardian wrote approvingly in his four-out-of-five star review that "[a]dmirers of the franchise will be relieved that the revival ... has lost none of its savagery or willingness to shock." Also writing for The Guardian, columnist Nesrine Malik described the new series as a "toothless performance" and the jokes "excruciatingly obvious".

In his three-out-of-five star review, Ralph Jones of NME lauded the series' ability to satirise timely events, "its topicality is admirable: there are several sketches here about events that occurred as little as 12 hours before the recording. This is impressive on the radio but when puppets are involved, it’s almost breathtaking."

The Economist was more mixed in their analysis, calling it "pretty tame" in light of the current political atmosphere and when compared to its 1984 predecessor, writing how "[i]n an era of cynicism and conspiracy theories, the radical act would be to make a show that celebrated public life." Ed Power of The Telegraph was negative in his one-out-of-five star review pertaining to the two-part US election special, calling it "toothless" in its satire.

German version
On 16 September 2021, a German version of Spitting Image called "The Krauts' Edition", began to air on the TV channel Sky. The German version has new puppets, including Sebastian Kurz, Jan Böhmermann, Annalena Baerbock, Karl Lauterbach, Markus Lanz, Heidi Klum, Thomas Müller, Olaf Scholz, Barbara Schöneberger, Armin Laschet, and Adolf Hitler. Puppets used in the British version such as Angela Merkel, Jurgen Klopp, and COVID-19, also appear in this version.

Stage show
A stage show titled Idiots Assemble: Spitting Image Saves The World will open at the Birmingham Repertory Theatre on 1 February 2023 and run until 12 March. It will be written by Al Murray, Matt Forde, and Sean Foley, directed by Foley, and featuring characters such as Boris Johnson, Tom Cruise, Michael Gove, Adele, Tyson Fury, Harry & Meghan, Stormzy, Beyoncé, Vladimir Putin, and Xi Jinping and more. New puppets made for the show include Suella Braverman, Volodymyr Zelenskyy, Jacob Rees-Mogg, Paddington Bear, and Nigel Farage.

References

Notes

External links

Spitting Image on YouTube

All the new Spitting Image puppets, ranked from least to most nightmarish, 2020 GQ article with picture-gallery

2020
2020 British television series debuts
2021 British television series endings
2020s British black comedy television series
2020s British satirical television series
2020s British political television series
2020s British television sketch shows
2020 United States presidential election in popular culture
BritBox original programming
British television series revived after cancellation
Political satirical television series
British satirical television series
British television shows featuring puppetry
Cultural depictions of the British Royal Family
Cultural depictions of politicians
Cultural depictions of sportspeople
Cultural depictions of actors
Cultural depictions of presenters
Cultural depictions of pop musicians
Cultural depictions of religious leaders
Cultural depictions of Boris Johnson
Cultural depictions of Donald Trump
Cultural depictions of Joe Biden
Cultural depictions of Vladimir Putin